Freddy Alirio Bernal Rosales is the ex-mayor of the Libertador Municipality in Caracas, Venezuela and a member of the United Socialist Party of Venezuela (PSUV).

Law enforcement
Prior to becoming a politician, the BBC says he "commanded a notorious metropolitan police elite corps known as the Z Group". In October 2014, President Nicolás Maduro made Bernal head of a newly created presidential commission concentrated on police reform. President Maduro stated that the goal of the commission led by Bernal was to review both CICPC and the Bolivarian National Police.

Political career
The BBC described Bernal as President Hugo Chavez's "most trusted mayor in Caracas", adding that the "opposition regard him as ultra-revolutionary". Bernal was also a leader of the Bolivarian Circles.

Controversy
In an 18 March 2015 interview with Globovisión, Bernal was asked "Can a homosexual be a police officer?" to where he replied, "Yes ... so long as they don’t manifest their sexual preference publicly. Because imagine if a police officer that might want to wear a pink shirt, or wear lipstick. I think that that, at least in Venezuela, I don’t know in other places, doesn’t go with our culture." He then attempted to clarify, stating "I have nothing against sexual diversity ... But they couldn’t manifest it publicly, because it goes against the structure of what a police officer should be." Bernal's remarks raised concerns of homophobia in Venezuela among the Venezuelan and the international LGBT communities.

Sanctions
Bernal has been sanctioned by several countries.

Canada

Canada sanctioned 40 Venezuelan officials, including Bernal, in September 2017. The sanctions were for behaviors that undermined democracy after at least 125 people will killed in the 2017 Venezuelan protests and "in response to the government of Venezuela's deepening descent into dictatorship".  Canadians were banned from transactions with the 40 individuals, whose Canadian assets were frozen. The sanctions noted a rupture of Venezuela's constitutional order.

United States
In 2011, four Hugo Chávez allies were sanctioned by the United States Department of the Treasury for allegedly helping FARC obtain weapons and smuggle drugs. Bernal, one of the sanctioned, dismissed the charges as "an aggression", saying he would not be frightened by the sanctions.

In November 2017, Bernal was again sanctioned by the United States Office of Foreign Assets Control after the 2017 Venezuelan Constituent Assembly election; the Treasury Department described the individuals sanctioned as being "associated with undermining electoral processes, media censorship, or corruption in government-administered food programs in Venezuela".

Panama
In March 2018, Panama sanctioned 55 public officials, including Bernal; the officials were sanctioned by the Panamanian government for their alleged involvement with "money laundering, financing of terrorism and financing the proliferation of weapons of mass destruction".

European Union 
On 25 June 2018, the European Union sanctioned eleven Venezuelan officials, including Bernal, in response to the May 2018 Venezuelan presidential election, which the E.U. described as "neither free nor fair".

Switzerland
On 10 July 2018, he was among 11 Venezuelans previously sanctioned by the European Union in June 2018 added to the sanctions list of Switzerland.

References

 
 

1962 births
Living people
United Socialist Party of Venezuela politicians
Mayors of places in Venezuela
People from San Cristóbal, Táchira
Fifth Republic Movement politicians
People of the Crisis in Venezuela
Venezuelan police officers
Members of the Venezuelan Constituent Assembly of 1999